This is a list of Tamil language films released in India during 2001.

List of Tamil films

January – March

April – June

July – September

October – December

Other releases
The following films also released in 2001, though the release date remains unknown.

Dubbed films
The following films were notable dubbed films also released in 2001.

Awards

References

2001
Lists of 2001 films by country or language
Films, Tamil
2000s Tamil-language films